"Post-Modern Sleaze" is a single released by British trip hop band Sneaker Pimps in 1997 from their debut album Becoming X. It reached number 22 on the UK Singles Chart and number 143 in Australia.

Track listing
 UK CD single
 "Post-Modern Sleaze (Video Mix)" – 3:48
 "Spin Spin Sugar (Reprazent Mix)" – 7:05
 "Post-Modern Sleaze (Underdog Remix)" – 7:05
 "Post-Modern Sleaze (Boilerhouse Remix)" – 3:53

 UK 12" single
 "Post-Modern Sleaze (Phunk Phorce Mix)" – 8:41
 "Post-Modern Sleaze (Sneak's A Pimp Mix)" – 7:58
 "Post-Modern Sleaze (Salt City Orchestra Nightclub Mix)" – 8:43
 "Post-Modern Sleaze (Reprazent Mix)" – 7:11

Charts

References

1997 singles
Song recordings produced by Flood (producer)
Song recordings produced by Jim Abbiss
Sneaker Pimps songs
1996 songs
Songs written by Liam Howe
Songs written by Chris Corner
Music videos directed by Howard Greenhalgh